Jonaspyge is a Neotropical genus of firetips in the family Hesperiidae.

Species
Jonaspyge aesculapus (Staudinger, 1876) Costa Rica, Panama, Colombia, Ecuador
Jonaspyge jonas (C. & R. Felder, 1859) Mexico, Guatemala, Nicaragua
Jonaspyge tzotzili (Freeman, 1969) Mexico

References
Natural History Museum Lepidoptera genus database

External links
images representing Jonaspyge at Consortium for the Barcode of Life

Hesperiidae
Hesperiidae of South America
Hesperiidae genera